Nurlan Asqaruly Nogaev (born 30 July 1967) is Kazakh politician who served as Minister of Energy from 18 December 2019 under Askar Mamin's cabinet until 7 September 2021, when he was transferred to the post of äkım (local head) of Mangystau Region. Prior before becoming an Energy Minister, he was the äkım of West Kazakhstan and Atyrau regions from 2012 to 2019.

Biography

Early life and education 
Born in the city of Oktyabrsk (present day Kandyagash), Nogaev attended the Gubkin Russian State University of Oil and Gas in Moscow where he earned specialty in mining engineering. In 1999, Nogaev majored in the Kazakh State Academy of Management in economics.

He currently holds master's in Business Administration from the Moscow State Institute of International Relations.

Early career 
Nogaev began his career as an electrician at the Kandagach Station in his hometown. From 1993, he worked as senior expert on petroleum products, head of department, general director of Gili-Pasker LLP in Moscow. In 1995, he became deputy general of the small enterprise Otrar Ltd in Almaty and from 1996, was marketing engineer, head of marketing, sales of Oil and Petroleum Products Department, General Director of Kazakhturkmunai LLP.

In February 2006, he was appointed as an executive director of KazMunayGas and from August of that year, was the director of the Oil Industry Department of the Ministry of Energy and Mineral Resources.

Political career 
In September 2007, Nogaev was appointed as deputy äkım of West Kazakhstan Region under Baktykozha Izmukhambetov. From there, he was promoted as the first deputy äkım in April 2010 and eventually took over office as the Äkım of West Kazakhstan Region on 20 January 2012 after Izmukhanbetov became a member of the Mazhilis. On 26 March 2016, Nogaev was transferred Atyrau Region where he continued on serving as the region's äkım. During his tenure, under the Agriculture Ministry's permission, restricted fishing in the Caspian Sea.

On 18 December 2019, under presidential decree, Nogaev was appointed as the Minister of Energy. He served the post until 7 September 2021, when Nogaev was relieved from his duties and was appointed to the äkım post again in the Mangystau Region, while the Ecology and Natural Resources Minister Magzum Myrzagaliev succeeded Nogaev as the Energy Minister.

After assuming office as Mangystau Region which was met with mixed reactions, Nogaev faces challenges in the region of which is plagued by drought and livestock deaths and series of strikes and labour conflicts.

References

1967 births
Living people
Ministers of Energy (Kazakhstan)
People from Mugalzhar District
Nur Otan politicians
Moscow State Institute of International Relations alumni